Casual Friday (also known as dress-down Friday or casual day) is a Western dress code trend in which businesses relax their dress code on Fridays. Businesses that usually require employees to wear suits, dress shirts, neckties, and dress shoes, may allow more casual or business casual wear on such days.

In 1994, 497 of the 1000 most important companies in America organized the casual Friday, including General Motors, Ford, and IBM.

The trend originated from Hawaii's midcentury custom of Aloha Friday which slowly spread to California, continuing around the globe until the 1990s when it became known as Casual Friday. Casual Friday began in the United States in the 1950s and 1960s, when Hewlett-Packard allowed his employees to dress more casually on Friday and work on new ideas.

Today in Hawaii, "Aloha Wear" is suitable business attire any day of the week, and the term "Aloha Friday" is generally used simply to refer to the last day of the workweek.

Valerie Steele described the introduction of casual Friday as the most radical change in work fashion since the 70s, when women asked the right to wear trousers in the office.

See also
 Casual wear
 Business casual
 Smart casual
 Workwear
 Sportswear
 Workweek and weekend

References 

Moran, Malie; Pohlmann, Attila & Reilly, Andrew (2014) Honolulu Street Style. University of Chicago Press, ISSN 2047-0568, ; p. 59.

Workwear
Friday
Casual wear